Dunelm is an abbreviation of the Latin word Dunelmensis. It is also the name of various things.

Dunelm or dunelm may refer to:
 The post-nominal abbreviation for Dunelmensis (Latin: of Durham), indicating a degree awarded by the University of Durham
 The official name of the Bishop of Durham
 Dunelm House, the Durham University building that houses Durham Students' Union
 Dunelm, a typeface from MADType
 Dunelm House, a house at Hummersknott Academy, Hummersknott, Darlington of County Durham
 Dunelm Block, also at Hummersknott school
 Any of various small businesses, from florists through funeral directors to plumbers, based in and around Durham
 Dunelm Group, formerly Dunelm Mill, an English fabric and soft furnishings company
 Dunelm, a Scottish hash of chicken or veal with mushrooms and cream